Sulev Vare (born 25 May 1962 in Kuressaare) is an Estonian politician. He was a member of XI Riigikogu.

References

Living people
1962 births
Estonian Reform Party politicians
Members of the Riigikogu, 2007–2011
Tallinn University of Technology alumni
People from Kuressaare